Ugo Pierre Jean Guy Raczynski (born 30 November 1977) is a French professional football manager, who manages the Sion U16s.

Managerial career
An amateur footballer, Raczynski began managing with the amateur side Vevey from 2013 to 2015. In 2015, he was appointed the manager of Martigny-Sports, where he stayed for six seasons. He left Martigny-Sports on 16 October 2020 after the COVID-19 pandemic, and joined FC Sion as the manager of their U16s. On 11 March 2021, Raczynski was appointed the interim coach for Sion for a period of 20 days, as they looked for a new manager. Marco Walker succeeded Raczynski six days later, on 17 March 2021.

References

External links

FC Sion Profile

1977 births
Living people
Sportspeople from Nancy, France
French people of Polish descent
French footballers
Association football defenders
FC Martigny-Sports players
French football managers
FC Martigny-Sports managers
FC Sion managers
Swiss Super League managers
French expatriate footballers
French expatriate football managers
French expatriate sportspeople in Switzerland
Expatriate footballers in Switzerland
Expatriate football managers in Switzerland
Footballers from Grand Est